Isabella (minor planet designation: 210 Isabella) is a large and dark asteroid from the central asteroid belt, approximately 80 kilometers in diameter. It was discovered in Pola by Johann Palisa on 12 November 1879. The origin of the name is unknown. The asteroid is probably composed of material similar to carbonaceous chondrites. It is classified as a member of the Nemesis family of asteroids.

References

External links 
 The Asteroid Orbital Elements Database
 Asteroid Lightcurve Data File
 
 

Nemesis asteroids
Isabella
Isabella
CF-type asteroids (Tholen)
Cb-type asteroids (SMASS)
18791112